Andreas Stylianou, who was born in 1942, is a former Greek Cypriot football player. Andreas Stylianou joined APOEL in 1963. He won the Cypriot Championship twice (1965, 1973). He also won the Cypriot Cup four times (1968, 1969, 1973, 1976) and the Cyprus FA Shield once, in 1963. Moreover, he was the top scorer of the Cypriot Championship in 1967 and 1971 and he was pronounced the best football player of the year in Cyprus in 1965 and 1974. 

Andreas Stylianou was the captain of APOEL during 1973-1974, when APOEL participated in the Greek Championship, being the champion of the previous Cypriot Championship, and managed to avoid relegation. APOEL would be the first team in Cyprus that would take part in the Greek Championship two consecutive seasons but, this institution stopped the next year, so the team returned to the Greek Cypriot Championship.

He appeared in 314 matches and scored 148 goals in all competitions with APOEL.

References

1942 births
Living people
APOEL FC players
Cypriot First Division players
Cypriot footballers
Cyprus international footballers
People from Paphos District
Association football forwards